Arnica parryi is a North American species of flowering plant known by the common names Parry's arnica or nodding arnica. It is native to western Canada (Yukon, British Columbia, Alberta) and the western United States as far south as Inyo County, California and McKinley County, New Mexico. It grows in temperate coniferous forests and alpine meadows in mountainous areas, primarily the Rocky Mountains, Cascades, and Sierra Nevada.

Arnica parryi is a rhizomatous perennial herb producing a single unbranched stem to heights between 10 and 60 centimeters. There are oval-shaped leaves around the base of the stem and a few pairs of longer, narrower petioled leaves above them. The leaves may approach 20 centimeters in length on larger individuals.

The inflorescence holds one to several daisylike flower heads, which nod as buds and then pull erect when the face opens. Each head has a center filled with yellow disc florets and usually no ray florets. The fruit is a cylindrical achene about half a centimeter long with a bristly pappus.

References

External links

Jepson Manual Treatment
united States Department of Agriculture Plants Profile
Callphotos Photo gallery, University of California

parryi
Flora of Yukon
Plants described in 1874
Flora of Western Canada
Flora of the Northwestern United States
Flora of the Southwestern United States
Flora without expected TNC conservation status